Coleocoma is a genus of flowering plants in the family Asteraceae.

There is only one known species, Coleocoma centaurea, native to Western Australia and the adjacent Northern Territory.

References

Monotypic Asteraceae genera
Inuleae
Endemic flora of Australia
Taxa named by Ferdinand von Mueller